Robert "Robbie" Conal (born 1944) is an American guerrilla poster artist noted for his gnarled, grotesque depictions of U.S. political figures of note.  A former hippie, he is noted for distributing his poster art throughout a city overnight using his "volunteer guerrilla postering army".

Overview

Conal's parents were both union organizers, and he grew up in Manhattan.  He "graduated" in arts from San Francisco State University in 1969, although he was two credits short of a degree. After living briefly in Canada he obtained a MFA from Stanford University in 1978, and moved to the Los Angeles area in 1984, where he currently resides.  Conal is an adjunct professor of painting and drawing at the University of Southern California's Roski School of Fine Arts.

Conal's work has been featured in numerous publications, including Time, Newsweek, the New York Times, the Los Angeles Times, as well as CBS's This Morning and Charlie Rose.  He was the subject of the 1992 documentary Post No Bills directed by filmmaker Clay Walker. He has also written three books, including Art Attack: The Midnight Politics Of A Guerrilla Artist Artburn, a collection of his work published in the alternative newspaper L.A. Weekly, and, Not Your Typical Political Animal, with his wife, Deborah Ross.  He has been awarded grants by the National Endowment for the Arts and the Getty Trust.

In 2004, Conal joined artists Shepard Fairey and Mear One to create a series of "anti-war, anti-Bush" posters for a street art campaign called "Be the Revolution" for the art collective Post Gen.

Conal was also one of the 112 members at the "Table of Free Voices" event in Berlin.

His art is in the permanent collections of The Metropolitan Museum of Art, the Los Angeles County Museum of Art, the San Jose Museum of Art, and the San Diego Museum of Art. Conal's posters have been prominently displayed in several major motion pictures, including, Sneakers, Falling Down, The Insider, Dead Presidents, Contagion, and The Sessions.

References

External links
 Robbie Conal's Art Attack!
 Dropping Knowledge
 Robbie Conal: Guerrilla Poster Artist – KCET interview with Conal
 Robbie Conal Posters in the collection of the Center for the Study of Political Graphics

See also
Guerilla art

American poster artists
American contemporary artists
Living people
University of Southern California faculty
Stanford University alumni
1944 births
Guerilla artists
The High School of Music & Art alumni